Wilfred is an American comedy television series that premiered on FX on June 23, 2011.  Based on the original Australian series, Wilfred, which aired a total of 16 episodes on SBS One, the series stars Elijah Wood as Ryan, along with series co-creator Jason Gann, reprising his eponymous role of Wilfred.

Each episode of the series typically revolves around Wilfred helping Ryan to some achievement, the object of which serves as the title of the episode. For example, the first three episodes of the series are titled "Happiness", "Trust", and "Fear". Each also opens with a quote concerning the title, after which every word but the title disappears.

The series moved to FX's sister channel FXX for its fourth and final season in 2014. A total of 49 episodes of Wilfred were aired over the course of four seasons, between June 23, 2011, and August 13, 2014.

Series overview

Episodes

Season 1 (2011)

Season 2 (2012)

Season 3 (2013)

Season 4 (2014)

References

External links 

Wilfred (American TV series)
Episodes